Noksapyeong Station is a subway station on the Seoul Subway Line 6. It is located on the eastern end of the Yongsan Garrison, and the western end of Itaewon. It is the main station servicing the Haebangchon and Hoenamu-gil communities, which are known for having significant foreign populations.

This station has low ridership due to its location, but is noted for its impressive interior design. It has five underground levels, and a glass dome on top of the building lets in sunlight which permeates throughout the station. In addition to being featured in Korean movies and dramas, weddings could be held there at no cost for a few years after opening. The embassy of the Philippines in South Korea is close to this station. Namsan lies just to the north, a 20-minute walk from the station.

Station layout

References

Metro stations in Yongsan District
Seoul Metropolitan Subway stations
Railway stations opened in 2000